"Mohammed's Radio" is a song by American singer-songwriter Warren Zevon. The song was released on his 1976 album Warren Zevon. The song was featured on A Quiet Normal Life: The Best of Warren Zevon and several other greatest hits-type albums by Zevon. Fleetwood Mac members Lindsey Buckingham and Stevie Nicks are also featured on this recording, as are Bobby Keys, Bob Glaub, and Waddy Wachtel.

By one telling, the title of the song was inspired by a Halloween parade Zevon witnessed in Aspen, Colorado in 1973. However, by another telling, Zevon simply liked the sound of the two words together.

In any case, the song has multiple levels of meaning, starting with the redemptive power of rock music, but extending to notions of escapism, cultural mixing, mysticism, and whether rationalities exist below the surface level of society. It features some of Zevon's trademark mordant irony. By another interpretation it is a negative portrayal of life in Los Angeles.

The song has been interpreted by other artists as well, most notably by Linda Ronstadt on her 1978 album Living in the USA, a track that gained airplay on album-oriented rock radio formats.

Critical response
Music critic John Rockwell devotes pages to the song – both  the Zevon original and 
the Ronstadt rendition – in his contribution to the Greil Marcus-edited 1979 collection of essays Stranded: Rock and Roll for a Desert Island, where among other things Rockwell describes it as "an artistic breakthrough" for Ronstadt.

A number of other books have yielded significant commentary on the song such as Philosophy Americana: Making Philosophy at Home in American Culture,
Rolling Stone Interv - Rolling Stone Magazine,

All Music Guide to Rock: The Definitive Guide to Rock, Pop, and Soul

Briefer references note that the song inspired an independent film in 1995 of the same title, and critic Dave Marsh put it near the top of a list of "best songs about radio".

Personnel
 Warren Zevon – Vocals, piano
 Stevie Nicks – Backing vocals
 Lindsey Buckingham – Guitar, backing vocals
 Bobby Keys – Saxophone
 Bob Glaub – Bass guitar
 Waddy Wachtel – Guitar
 David Lindley – Lap steel guitar
 Larry Zack – Drums, percussion

Technical
Jackson Browne - Producer
Ken Caillat - Engineer

References

Warren Zevon songs
Songs written by Warren Zevon
1976 songs
Linda Ronstadt songs
Songs about radio